The Whole Wide World is a 1979 compilation album by British new wave musician Wreckless Eric, intended to break him in the American market. It consists of his singles up to that point, some b-sides and selected tracks from the albums Wreckless Eric and The Wonderful World of Wreckless Eric.

In 1980, an LP with the same track listing was added as a bonus to the album Big Smash!

Track listing
All songs written by Wreckless Eric.

CD
 "Intro"
 "Whole Wide World"
 "Take the Cash"
 "Let's Go to the Pictures"
 "Walking on the Surface of the Moon"
 "Hit & Miss Judy"
 "I Wish It Would Rain"
 "Reconnez Cherie"
 "Veronica"
 "Brain Thieves"
 "Semaphore Signals"
 "I Need a Situation"
 "The Final Taxi"
 "There Isn't Anything Else"

References

External links
Official Wreckless Eric website

Wreckless Eric albums
1979 compilation albums
Stiff Records compilation albums